Events in the year 1969 in the Republic of India.

Incumbents
 President of India – Zakir Hussain until 3 May, V. V. Giri until 20 July (acting president), Mohammad Hidayatullah until 24 August (acting president), V. V. Giri
 Prime Minister of India – Indira Gandhi
 Chief Justice of India – Mohammad Hidayatullah

Governors
 Andhra Pradesh – Khandubhai Kasanji Desai 
 Assam – Braj Kumar Nehru 
 Bihar – Nityanand Kanungo 
 Gujarat – Shriman Narayan
 Haryana – Birendra Narayan Chakraborty 
 Jammu and Kashmir – Bhagwan Sahay 
 Karnataka – Gopal Swarup Pathak (until 30 August), vacant thereafter (starting 30 August)
 Kerala – V. Viswanathan 
 Madhya Pradesh – K. Chengalaraya Reddy 
 Maharashtra – P V Cherian (until 8 November), vacant thereafter (starting 8 November)
 Nagaland – B.K. Nehru 
 Odisha – Shaukatullah Shah Ansari 
 Punjab – Dadappa Chintappa Pavate
 Rajasthan – Sardar Hukam Singh 
 Tamil Nadu – Sardar Ujjal Singh (starting 14 January)
 Uttar Pradesh – Bezawada Gopala Reddy 
 West Bengal – 
 until 1 April: Dharma Vira 
 1 April-19 September: Deep Narayan Sinha
 starting 19 September: Shanti Swaroop Dhavan

Events
 National income - 438,360 million
 14 January - Madras State gets renamed to Tamil Nadu through parliamentary law.
 12 July – Congress Parliamentary Board at Bangalore nominated Neelam Sanjiva Reddy as Congress's candidate for the post of President of India by a vote of four to two.
 19 July – Morarji Desai resigned from the post of Deputy Prime Minister of India.
 18 September: Start of the 1969 Gujarat riots
 12 November – Congress Working Committee headed by S. Nijalingappa removed Indira Gandhi from primary membership of Congress Party.
 Indian National Congress splits into two factions. One led by Indira Gandhi and another led by Morarji Desai.
 Rajdhani Express was introduced
 14 banks nationalized
 Indian Space Research Organisation (ISRO) was set up
 Central Industrial Security Force (CISF) came into existence (10 March 1969)

Law.   
• Registration of Births and Death Act ( RBD Act)

Births
24 May – Sudhir Kumar Walia, Indian Army. (died 1999).
2 April  Ajay Devgan, actor and producer.
21 June – Padmapani Acharya, Indian Army. (died 1999).
4 November  Rupini, actress.
7 November – Nandita Das, actress.
25 November  Sukanya, actress and dancer. 
11 December – Viswanathan Anand, chess grandmaster and multiple time World Chess Champion.

Full date unknown
Soumya Bhattacharya, journalist and author.
M. Yoganathan, environmental activist.

Deaths
31 January – Meher Baba, mystic and spiritual master (born 1894).
10 January -Sampurnanand, writer and politician (born 1891).
23 February – Madhubala, actress (born 1933).
3 May – Zakir Hussain, politician and third President of India (born 1897).
13 June – Acharya Atre, Writer, Poet, Social Activist in the Samyukta Maharashtra Movement (born 1898).
28 July – Annabhau Sathe, social reformer and writer (born 1920).

See also 
 List of Bollywood films of 1969

2 February C.N.Annadurai politician-chief Minister of Tamil Nadu(State of India)

References

 
India
Years of the 20th century in India